The E. W. Norris Service Station, at Market and Main Sts. in Glen Elder, Kansas, was built in 1926.  It was listed on the National Register of Historic Places in 1976.  The building is now the Castle Lodge hotel.

It is a  building made of creamy-buff post rock limestone quarried near Glen Elder.

References

Gas stations on the National Register of Historic Places in Kansas
National Register of Historic Places in Mitchell County, Kansas
Hotel buildings completed in 1926
Hotels in Kansas